The 1999 FIBA Under-19 World Championship (Portuguese: Campeonato Mundial Sub-19 da FIBA de 1999) was the 6th edition of the FIBA U19 World Championship. It was held in multiple cities in Portugal, with the later rounds held in the capital city of Lisbon, from 15 to 25 July 1999. Spain, won their first (and only, as of 2019), championship in the tournament, by defeating the United States, 94–87 in the Gold Medal Game. Croatia notched their first-ever podium finish, after defeating Argentina 66–59, in the Bronze Medal Game. Andrei Kirilenko of Russia, was named the tournament MVP.

Venues

Qualified teams

Preliminary round

Group A

Group B

Group C

Group D

Quarterfinal round

Group E

Group F

Group G

Group H

Classification 13th–16th
</onlyinclude>

Semifinals

15th place

13th place

Classification 9th–12th
</onlyinclude>

Semifinals

11th place

9th place

Classification 5th–8th
</onlyinclude>

Semifinals

7th place

5th place

Final round
</onlyinclude>

Semifinals

3rd place

Final

Final standings

Source: FIBA Archive

Awards

References

External links
 FIBA Basketball Archive

1999
1999 in basketball
International youth basketball competitions hosted by Portugal
1999–2000 in Portuguese basketball
July 1999 sports events in Europe